Leighton Warren Smith Jr.  (born August 20, 1939) is a former United States Navy admiral. In 1994, he became the Commander in Chief of United States Naval Forces Europe and Allied Forces Southern Europe, holding the commands during the height of the Yugoslav wars. He commanded the NATO enacted no-fly zone (Operation Deny Flight) over Bosnia and the later bombing campaign against Republika Srpska (Operation Deliberate Force) in 1995. The same year he additionally took on command of the NATO-led Implementation Force (IFOR) in Bosnia with the objective of overseeing the peace agreement. He held all three positions until his retirement in 1996.

Early life and education
Smith was born in Mobile, Alabama, on August 20, 1939, and graduated from the United States Naval Academy with the Class of 1962. He received his wings in January 1964.

Naval career
As a naval aviator, Smith flew carrier-based A-4 Skyhawk and A-7 Corsair II light attack jet aircraft during multiple deployments to the Mediterranean, North Atlantic, Western Pacific and Indian Oceans. These included three cruises in waters off North Vietnam where he flew over 280 combat missions, primarily in the A-7 Corsair II. He has logged over 4,200 flying hours and accumulated over 1000 carrier arrested landings.

Commands
Smith's early flag officer tours were Director for Operations, United States European Command (1989–1991) and Deputy Chief of Naval Operations for Plans, Policy and Operations (1991–1994). Appointed to four-star rank in April 1994, he became Commander in Chief, United States Naval Forces Europe and concurrent NATO Commander in Chief Allied Forces Southern Europe (1994–1996). In December 1995, he assumed, concurrently, command of the NATO-led Implementation Force (IFOR) in Bosnia, a position he held until August 1996.

Smith's IFOR command in Bosnia was criticized by Richard Holbrooke for his refusal to use his authority to also perform nonmilitary implementation tasks, including arresting indicted war criminals:

Later work
Smith retired from the US Navy on 1 October 1996. He is currently serving as a Senior Fellow at the Center for Naval Analyses, was President of Leighton Smith Associates and Vice President of Global Perspectives, Inc., both international consulting firms. He was Chairman of the Naval Aviation Museum Foundation, immediate past Chairman of the Board of Trustees of the United States Naval Academy Alumni Association and served on the Executive Committee of the Association of Naval Aviation. 
He was also on the National Advisory Council to the Navy League and was a member of the Board of Directors of several corporations.

Smith was a supporter of the John McCain 2008 presidential campaign before the 2008 election. Smith spoke out in defense of McCain after critical comments from General Wesley Clark regarding McCain's military experience. Prior to his retirement, Smith had previously served alongside General Clark for several years during the war in Bosnia and Herzegovina.

Smith has been one of the senior signatories of the March 31, 2009 letter urging the president to maintain the policy excluding homosexuals from the armed forces.

Awards and decorations

References

Adapted from this biography. (2003)

External links
 Smith discusses military forces in the Balkans (to the North Atlantic Council - Brussels, 17 July 1996) 

1939 births
Living people
United States Navy admirals
United States Naval Academy alumni
Recipients of the Legion of Merit
Recipients of the Distinguished Flying Cross (United States)
Recipients of the Gallantry Cross (Vietnam)
Recipients of the Order of Merit of the Republic of Hungary
Grand Officers of the Ordre national du Mérite
Honorary Knights Commander of the Order of the British Empire
United States Navy personnel of the Vietnam War
Military personnel from Mobile, Alabama
Recipients of the Air Medal
Recipients of the Defense Distinguished Service Medal
Recipients of the Navy Distinguished Service Medal
NATO personnel in the Bosnian War